Pawe or PAWE may mean:

 Pawe Special Woreda, a woreda (type of division) of Ethiopia
 Paveh, a city in Iran
 Performing Arts Workers' Equity, a trade union in South Africa